Oberstdorf station is the station of the Bavarian market town of Oberstdorf in the German state of Bavaria. It has five platforms and is classified by Deutsche Bahn as a category 3 station. The station is served by about 40 trains daily operated by Deutsche Bahn and Regentalbahn. The station is the terminus of the Immenstadt–Oberstdorf railway.

Location

The station is located to the north of central Oberstdorf. The station is connected to the town centre by the Hauptstraße (main street), which runs to the south of the station from the station forecourt. The station building is located on the forecourt and has the address of Bahnhofstraße 2. It runs perpendicular to the platforms at the end of the railway tracks. Bahnhofstrasse (station street) runs from the station forecourt on the eastern side of the station. The name of Bahnhofstrasse changes to Friedhofstraße (cemetery street) near the end of the platforms where some sidings begin. Next to the sidings is Oberstdorf cemetery. To the west of the station on Poststraße there is a bus station, which has two bus platforms. A little further west on Poststraße, is Straße Im Steinach. Between Straße Im Steinach and the station are residences and an industrial park. To the north Straße Im Steinach crosses the railway tracks over a level crossing. After crossing the railway tracks it runs past the eastern end of Friedhofstraße and becomes the Straße Am Bannholz.

History

On 16 November 1873, the Royal Bavarian State Railways opened the Immenstadt–Sonthofen railway to connect with the Buchloe–Lindau railway. The Oberstdorf community then campaigned for a rail connection. As the Royal Bavarian State Railroad was not interested, the private Lokalbahn AG (LAG) company applied for a concession to extend the Immenstadt–Sonthofen line to Oberstdorf. The line was opened on 29 July 1888. The station building, which was built in the company style of Lokalbahn AG, and a rolling stock depot (Bahnbetriebswerk) for the maintenance of LAG rolling stock on the line were opened at the same time. On 1 August 1938, the station was nationalised along with the Sonthofen–Oberstdorf line. On 23 March 1951, the depot became a branch of Kempten rolling stock depot. The Oberstdorf branch office was closed on 1  January 1964. The station building was destroyed in the Second World War, so a new station was built in 1963. Since 1976, operations in Oberstdorf station has been controlled by the dispatcher at Oberstdorf signal box, which entered service in 1976. It is a track plan interlocking of Lorenz class 60. The station building built in 1963 was replaced by a newer building in 2001. The station was voted best small town station of the year by Allianz pro Schiene (Pro Rail Alliance) In 2006. This award was particularly based on the new station building and the Oberstdorf transport plan.

Infrastructure

Station buildings

The station building built in 1963 was replaced in 2001 by a newer, more modern building. It was designed by the architects Rhoda, Kellermann and Wawrowsky. The building cost about eleven million Marks, which would now correspond to about €5.6 million. The building is covered with wood and is owned by DB Station&Service. The building has an area of about 12,000 square metres and contains six shops and a ticket office. The station buildings also contains public toilets.

Platforms

The station has five tracks on three platforms. Track 1 is on a side platform. Tracks 2 and 3 are on a central platform and tracks 4 and 5 are on another. The station building is to the south across the ends of the platforms. Track 2 and 4 are used by Regional-Express services to Augsburg. The Allgäu-Franken-Express in contrast runs from track 1. Track 3 is served by Regional-Express trains to Ulm. The alex service to Munich and Intercity services use tracks 4 and 5. All platforms are roofed and are fitted with digital train destination indicators. All trains are accessible by wheelchair. There are several shops and a travel centre in the station building. 
 
Platform 1 is 227 metres long and 38 cm high. The central platform between tracks 2 and 3 has a length of 273 metres and a height of 38 cm. The platform between tracks 4 and 5 is 38 cm high and 330 metres long.

Operations

Oberstdorf station is served by around 40 trains daily. A pair of Intercity services called the Nebelhorn operates daily on the Hamburg–Hamburg-Altona–Kassel-Wilhelmshöhe–Würzburg–Augsburg–Oberstdorf route. From Hamburg to Augsburg it is coupled with the Königsee Intercity service, which continues from Augsburg to Berchtesgaden. Another pair of Intercity service called the Allgäu also runs once a day on the Oberstdorf–Ulm–Stuttgart–Mannheim–Düsseldorf–Dortmund–Hanover route. Between Ulm and Oberstdorf the service runs towards Oberstdorf as a Regional-Express service, although in the opposite direction it runs as an Intercity service with higher fares. Both Intercity services are hauled by class 218 locomotives.

Oberstdorf station has been served since 9 December 2007 by alex (until 2010: Arriva Länderbahn-Express) services operated by Regentalbahn between Munich and Lindau and between Munich and Oberstdorf. The alex services are hauled by ER20 locomotives. Their rolling stock is modernised Deutsche Bahn compartment carriages or modernised Silberling carriages. Since 10 December 2006, the Allgäu-Franken-Express has run two or three times a day using class 612 diesel multiple units between Nuremberg and Oberstdorf. Also Regional-Express services operated with class 612 DMUs complement the Allgäu-Franken-Express between Augsburg and Oberstdorf every two hours. Regional-Express services also operated with class 612 DMUs connect Ulm and Oberstdorf via Kempten. During peak hour, every two hours a Regionalbahn service operates from Immenstadt to Oberstdorf, producing, in combination with the RE services, a service every 30 minutes between Immenstadt and Oberstdorf.

Notes

Railway stations in Bavaria
Railway stations in Germany opened in 1888